César André Costa Dias (born 7 July 1991), known as Teka, is a Portuguese futsal player who plays for AD Fundão as a winger.

Career
Born in Amadora, he started competing in futsal at Presa Casal Rato, representing them for two seasons, before joining Sporting CP at age 16.

In the summer of 2010, Teka was tested by Paulo Fernandes in the preseason trainings, signing a one year deal on 3 September 2010. The 20-year-old renewed his contract on 29 July 2011, and helped the club win a league and cup double.

After sustaining an ACL knee injury in November 2012, Teka was loaned out for the 2013-14 season to SL Olivais. On 18 June 2014, he joined Fundão, which had just won its first Portuguese Cup, a month earlier.

Honours
SL Benfica
Liga Portuguesa de Futsal: 2011–12
Taça de Portugal de Futsal: 2011–12
SuperTaça de Futsal de Portugal: 2010–11, 2011–12

References

1991 births
Living people
People from Amadora
Sportspeople from Lisbon
Portuguese men's futsal players
S.L. Benfica futsal players